Kim Deitch (born May 21, 1944 in Los Angeles, California) is an American cartoonist who was an important figure in the underground comix movement of the 1960s, remaining active in the decades that followed with a variety of books and comics, sometimes using the pseudonym Fowlton Means.

Much of Kim Deitch's work deals with the animation industry and characters from the world of cartoons. His best-known character is a mysterious cat named Waldo, who appears variously as a famous cartoon character of the 1930s, as an actual character in the "reality" of the strips, as the hallucination of a hopeless alcoholic surnamed Mishkin (a victim of the Boulevard of Broken Dreams), as the demonic reincarnation of Judas Iscariot; and who, occasionally, is claimed to have overcome Deitch and written the comics himself. Waldo's appearance is reminiscent of such black cat characters as Felix the Cat, Julius the Cat, and Krazy Kat.

The son of illustrator and animator Gene Deitch, Kim Deitch has sometimes worked with his brothers Simon Deitch and Seth Deitch.

Biography 
Deitch's influences include Winsor McCay, Chester Gould, Jack Cole, and Will Eisner; he attended the Pratt Institute. Before deciding to become a professional cartoonist, Deitch worked odd jobs and did manual labor, including with the merchant marine. Searching for a path, he at one point joined the  Republican Party; at another point he became devotee of Hatha yoga.

Deitch regularly contributed comical, psychedelia-tinged comic strips (featuring the flower child "Sunshine Girl" and "Uncle Ed, The India Rubber Man") to New York City's premier underground newspaper, the East Village Other, beginning in 1967. He joined Bhob Stewart as an editor of EVO's all-comics spin-off, Gothic Blimp Works, in 1969. During this period, he lived with fellow cartoonist Spain Rodriguez in a sixth-floor walk-up apartment in New York's East Village.

Deitch was also a publisher, as co-founder of the Cartoonists Co-Op Press, a publishing venture by Deitch, Jay Lynch, Bill Griffith, Jerry Lane, Willy Murphy, Diane Noomin, and Art Spiegelman that operated in 1973–1974.

Deitch's The Boulevard of Broken Dreams was chosen by Time magazine in 2005 as one of the 100 best English-language graphic novels ever written. In 2008, the Museum of Comic and Cartoon Art featured a retrospective exhibition of his work.

Personal life 
From his first relationship, to cartoonist and author Trina Robbins, Deitch has a daughter, Casey.
Through most of the 1970s, Deitch was in an 11-year relationship with animator Sally Cruikshank. He met Pam Butler in 1994 and they subsequently married.

Awards
Deitch won the 2003 Eisner Award for Best Single Issue for The Stuff of Dreams (Fantagraphics) and in 2008 he was awarded an Inkpot Award. In 2014, he was nominated for the Ignatz Award for Outstanding Graphic Novel for The Amazing, Enlightening and Absolutely True Adventures of Katherine Whaley.

Bibliography

Creator series and books 
 Books arranged in order by original published date (publication date shown first, then title, publisher, number of pages, date drawn, and availability). OOP = Out Of Print.
 2019 Reincarnation Stories (Fantagraphics, 260 pg) Hardback
 2013 The Amazing, Enlightening and Absolutely True Adventures of Katherine Whaley! (Fantagraphics, 176 pg) Hardback
 2010 The Search for Smilin' Ed (Fantagraphics, 162 pg) — serialized in Zero Zero beginning in 1999 
 2007 Deitch's Pictorama (Fantagraphics, 184 pg) — co-authored with Simon Deitch and Seth Kallen Deitch; includes 78-pg "Sunshine Girl"
 2006 Shadowland (Fantagraphics, 182 pg) — 10 stories (OOP)
 2002 The Stuff of Dreams (Fantagraphics, 136 pg)  — original OOP; re-released by Pantheon as a hardback in 2007 as Alias the Cat!
 1993 The Mishkin File! (Fantagraphics, 32 pg) original OOP; reprinted in The Boulevard of Broken Dreams (Pantheon 2002)
 1992 All Waldo Comics (Fantagraphics, 60 pg) — 5 Waldo stories published from 1969-1988 (OOP)
 1991 The Boulevard of Broken Dreams (original published in Raw [OOP]; re-released by Pantheon as a hardback in 2002, 160 pg) — with Simon Deitch
 1990 A Shroud for Waldo (Fantagraphics, 158 pg)
 1989 Beyond the Pale (Fantagraphics, 136 pg) — 22 stories produced from 1969-1984 (OOP)
 1988 Hollywoodland (Fantagraphics, 76 pg) — 1984 story (OOP)
 1988 No Business Like Show Business (3-D Zone)
 1972–1973 Corn Fed Comics (Honeywell & Todd and Cartoonists Co-Op Press, 2 issues)

Publications appeared in

Apex Treasury of Underground Comics, Links Books/Quick Fox, 1974, 
Arcade
Bijou Funnies — issues #2, 3, and 8
Corporate Crime Comics
East Village Other
Gothic Blimp Works
Heavy Metal
High Times
Laugh in the Dark
LA Weekly
 Lean Years
 Mineshaft Magazine
Pictopia
Prime Cuts
Raw
Swift Comics (Bantam Books, April 1971) — with Art Spiegelman, Allan Shenker and Trina Robbins
Southern Fried Fugitives
Tales of Sex and Death
Get Stupid
Webcomic Hurricane Relief Telethon
Weirdo
Young Lust
Zero Zero

Animation
Easy Groove ID, Nickelodeon, 1987
Farmer & Cat ID, MTV, 1996

References

External links

 Ford, Jeffrey. "An Interview with Kim Deitch", Fantastic Metropolis (Oct. 9, 2002)
 Heller, Steven. AIGA.com: "Underground Comix Come of Age: An Interview with Kim Deitch" (March 27, 2007).
 Kim Deitch's entry in the Webcomic Hurricane Relief Telethon
 "The Ship That Never Came In!," an animated cartoon based on a Waldo strip that Deitch originally wrote for Pictopia in 1992.
 

1944 births
American comics artists
American comic strip cartoonists
American comics writers
Inkpot Award winners
Jewish American artists
Jewish American writers
Underground cartoonists
Raw (magazine)
Living people
People from the East Village, Manhattan
21st-century American Jews